Bir Ghbalou is a commune of Bouïra Province, Algeria.

Districts of Algeria
Populated places in Bouïra Province